Lohse is a German-language surname. Notable people with the name include:

 Adolf Lohse (1807–1867), Prussian master builder and architect
 Anna Lohse (1866–1942), Danish teacher and women's rights activist
 Bobby Lohse (born 1958), Swedish sailor
 Brian Lohse (born 1968), American politician
 Bruno Lohse (1911–2007), German art dealer and looter during World War II
 Detlef Lohse (born 1963), German physicist
 Ernst Lohse (1944–1994), Danish architect and designer
 Gustav Lohse (1911–1999), German film editor
 Hinrich Lohse (1896–1964), Nazi German politician and convicted war criminal
 Kyle Lohse (born 1978), American baseball pitcher
 Martin Lohse (born 1971), Danish composer and visual artist
 Martin J. Lohse (born 1956), German physician and pharmacologist
 Oswald Lohse (1845–1915), German astronomer
 Otto Lohse (1859–1925), German conductor and composer
 René Lohse (born 1973), German ice dancer
 Richard Paul Lohse (1902–1988), Swiss painter and graphic artist
 Elfriede Lohse-Wächtler (1899–1940), German avant-garde painter

German-language surnames
Surnames from given names